The South Ocean Stakes is a Canadian Thoroughbred horse race held annually at Woodbine Racetrack in Toronto, Ontario. A race for two-year-old fillies on Tapeta synthetic dirt over a distance of a mile and a sixteen, it offers a purse of $100,000. Part of the Ontario Sire Stakes program, it is restricted to horses sired by a stallion certified as standing in the Province of Ontario.

From the first running in 1997 through 2005, the race was contested on natural dirt. In 2006 the synthetic racing surface known as Polytrack was installed and used until 2016 when it was replaced with the current Tapeta synthetic racing surface.

Race name
The stakes was named for the racemare South Ocean, a multiple stakes winner bred by E. P. Taylor at his Windfields Farm in Ontario. Bred to super-sire and sire of sires Northern Dancer, South Ocean was the dam of the Champion runner and important sire Storm Bird. Again with Northern Dancer, South Ocean produced Northernette, a Canadian Champion at age two and three and a Canadian Horse Racing Hall of Fame inductee who herself became an influential broodmare.

Records
Speed record:
 1:44.70 @ 1 miles: Lexie Lou (2013)

Most wins by a jockey:
 2 - Todd Kabel (2002, 2004)
 2 - Eurico Rosa Da Silva (2008, 2016)
 2 - Steve Bahen (2011, 2012)

Most wins by a trainer:
 3 - Mark Casse (2009, 2014, 2018)

Most wins by an owner:
 As at 2019, no owner has won this race more than once.

Winners

References

Ontario Sire Stakes
Ungraded stakes races in Canada
Mile category horse races for fillies and mares
Recurring sporting events established in 1997
Woodbine Racetrack